Sérgio Sette Câmara Filho (born 23 May 1998) is a Brazilian racing driver who currently drives for NIO 333 FE Team in Formula E.

Career

FIA Formula 3 European Championship

2014

After he turned 16, Sette Câmara was legally able to race in the national F3 championship (Class A) in Brazil. He made his debut at the fourth round at Interlagos. Although he could not quite match up to teammate Pedro Piquet, he finished the year with a strong seventh.

He also made his European F3 debut at the second-last round at Imola, driving for EuroInternational. Driving as a guest driver and ineligible for championship points, Sette Câmara finished 14th, 20th, and 21st respectively in the three races over the weekend.

2015

After a one-off appearance that year, Sette Câmara made his full-time debut for the 2015 season, driving for Motopark. After a rather disappointing start to the season, his luck turned for the better at Spa where he achieved his first podium in Europe where he finished 3rd. After that race, Sette Câmara went on to score more consistently than not while achieving another 3rd place at Red Bull Ring and went on to finish 14th in the championship with 57.5 points next to his name.

Masters of Formula 3

The annual meeting at Zandvoort for the Masters of F3 event was a successful one for Sette Câmara, bagging a pole position for the qualification race. In that race, he finished in third place and also finished third in the main race.

Macau Grand Prix

Another annual meeting for Formula 3 drivers, this time at Macau, a circuit Sette Câmara had not competed on before. His weekend started well by qualifying 7th, an impressive result for a rookie. In the qualification race, he improved one position to finish a respectable sixth place. In the main race, he struck trouble before finishing 22nd, last of the runners and two minutes off eventual winner Felix Rosenqvist. Despite the disappointing result, Sette Câmara recorded the fastest lap of the race which not only was over 1.5 seconds faster than his own fastest qualifying lap, but it is now also the outright lap record for the Macau GP circuit.

2016

Returning with Motopark for a second season, now part of the Red Bull Junior Team, the 2016 season for Sette Câmara started off with a tricky weekend at Circuit Paul Ricard when he was taken out by his teammate at the first corner in race 1. But from Hungaroring onwards, Sette Câmara started to prove that he was a genuine competitor on the track by performing some top quality overtaking maneuvers and consistently finishing in the 'points paying positions' including podiums at Pau and Red Bull Ring. Unfortunately, Sette Câmara's second half of the season was less than lucky for him: he had many high grid position placings, including a pole position, taken away from him due to grid penalties and suffered other problems, including a drive-through penalty whilst running in 2nd place at Hockenheim. He finished 11th in the championship at seasons end but that did not justify the pace he had all year.

Masters of Formula 3

Like last year's event, Sette Câmara enjoyed success at the Zandvoort event. After qualifying 7th for the qualification race, he ended finishing 5th in that race and then in the main race, Sette Câmara finished 3rd once again to top off a successful outing.

Macau Grand Prix

Returning after a record-breaking race weekend for him in last year's event, Sette Câmara came into the event with Carlin, a team he had never raced with previously. With past winner Antonio Felix da Costa and rising stars Jake Hughes and Lando Norris as his teammates, Sette Câmara was not going to have it easy. He showed his strong form by qualifying in 4th place, just one place behind da Costa. In the qualification race, Sette Câmara made up 1 place in the race to finish 3rd behind da Costa and former Red Bull Junior Callum Ilott. For the main race, Sette Câmara held the lead for half of the race in strong fashion until Nikita Mazepin crashed and brought out the safety car. Once the safety car came in, he was immediately pressured by da Costa and lost the lead in an epic duel between them and Felix Rosenqvist, reigning and 2-time winner of this event, also snuck by Sette Câmara after putting extreme pressure on and Sette Câmara held onto 3rd place at the end of the race to take a podium in one of the most prestigious events in world motorsport, finishing behind now 2-time winner da Costa and Rosenqvist.

2017

Macau Grand Prix

Returning for his third attempt, Sette Câmara had a lot more of a challenge on his plate due to being out of a Formula 3 car all year as he has been racing Formula 2 machinery. But, he has a lot to prove as he still is the current race lap record holder which he set in 2015 and in 2016 he led the first half of the main race so he knows how to drive around Macau in a fast manner. The start of the weekend had big downs and even bigger downs as he was the fastest in FP1 but that involved hitting the wall and in qualifying, his best lap was ruined by making contact with the wall and had to settle for 9th. That did not hamper his progress through the qualification race as he made a rapid start making his way to fifth by the end of lap 1 before reaching 3rd and pressuring Joel Eriksson for 2nd. Unfortunately, Joel held his own and Sette Câmara finished an impressive 3rd from 9th on the grid.

The main race, however, was a race for the history books as the race itself was the perfect example of the edge of your seat entertainment and real, hard and fair racing. For Sette Câmara however, it was a fairytale that quickly turned into his biggest nightmare. After obtaining the lead after both Joel Eriksson and Callum Ilott both ran into trouble once it went from yellow flag to green flag conditions, Sette Câmara inherited the lead and held it until the final lap. After firstly being under immense pressure from Maximilian Günther and then the fast charging and driver of the day Ferdinand Habsburg, Sette Câmara looked set to take victory but he was overtaken around the outside on the final corner on the last lap by Habsburg and both drivers went into the wall after carrying too much speed into the corner but only Habsburg managed to make it across the line so Sette Câmara was classified as 13th place despite not making it past the chequered flag in what was an incredible drive leading up to the moment and deserved a win or at least  a podium placement.

Toyota Racing Series

Sette Câmara made his debut in 2015 after replacing Dzhon Simonyan at Taupo. He ended the season with 199 points next to his name and placed 20th overall.

FIA Formula 2 Championship

In November 2016, Câmara was confirmed to be stepping up to FIA Formula 2 Championship with MP Motorsport.

2017

Arriving at Bahrain for Round 1 of the new era of Formula 2, Sette Câmara had a challenge on his hands as he not only had to prove he can match experienced teammate Jordan King, but he also had to prove that being the youngest driver on the grid was not going to hold him back, and after qualifying, he proved he can be quick from the get go as he qualified an impressive 10th for his first ever race and qualified 1 place ahead of his teammate in the process. Race 1 proved to be the real challenge however as tyre degradation played a massive role in the outcome of the race but Sette Câmara held on nicely and took a fine 12th place at the end but got relegated to 13th after a time penalty for forcing Campos driver Ralph Boschung off the track. Race 2 did not end up too much better for Sette Câmara as a puncture on lap 1 forced him into the pits for a tyre change and he did not help his own cause by stalling in the pits either. Eager to prove his worth after a major setback, Sette Câmara went out and while he was too far back from the rest of the field, he was lapping times quicker than most. By the end, he finished a miserable 18th but set the fastest lap of the race and was the only driver to lap a 1: 43-second lap but unfortunately did not get the 2 points for the fastest lap as he failed to finish inside the top 10.

Unfortunately for Sette Câmara, points did not get earned at either Spain or Monaco. Struggling for genuine pace in the feature race before being forced off the track by Johnny Cecotto in the sprint race at Spain and being to told to stop crying by his own team over the radio and retiring with a suspension failure whilst in the points in the feature race and being stuck at the back of the field due to extremely difficult overtaking opportunities in the sprint race at Monaco were his problems.

Baku, Austria, Silverstone and Hungaroring were also quiet and scoreless runs for Sette Câmara but could have had a breakthrough points score in Austria after qualifying 2nd before being disqualified and sent to the back of the grid for having an irregular fuel sample in the car and to sum up his season going into the summer break, scoring 0 points from 14 races was certainly not what Sette Câmara planned to achieve.

After the summer break, Sette Câmara returned the famous and prestigious Spa circuit where he has had much success in the past and certainly would have wanted to keep that going. He also had all the motivation in the world after brilliant driver coaching during the break by successful open-wheeled racer and former GP2 driver Tom Dillmann. After qualifying 11th for the feature race in a session that was undertaken in heavy rain, Sette Câmara wasted no time in making his way up inside the top 10. He nailed the pit stop and continued to finish in 8th, his first points finish of the session, before being promoted to 6th after the disqualifications of Charles Leclerc and Oliver Rowland. Starting 3rd for the sprint race, Sette Câmara made the best start of the season as he got away beautifully and managed to have a massive gap and clean line all to himself after turn 1. He had tough competition behind him, but Sette Câmara managed to slowly continue to increase the gap back to 2nd place, showed no signs of being pressured, made no mistakes at all and held onto the lead until the end. A safety car with 3 laps to go to recover Nobuharu Matsushita who crashed heavily at Raidillon cemented his 1st-place finish and took his first race win in not only Formula 2, but in car racing, in general, as he had not won a race since his karting days.

1 week later at Monza, Sette Câmara came in with all of the momenta in the world after his first win and while qualifying 11th was not the best start his 2 races were top class once again. Having a quiet race up until the frantic final laps of the feature race, he finished 6th after all of the penalties were set in stone and once again started 3rd for the sprint race, where once again he capitalised on his improving race pace and captured 2nd place after losing the lead to the fast charging Luca Ghiotto and held his own for another deserving podium.

For the penultimate round at Jerez, which was a stand-alone event for F2 and GP3 to make up for the German Grand Prix not being able to host an event that year, Sette Câmara was at another he was not quite familiar with, although only a handful of drivers have had previous experience at the track so Sette Câmara’s inexperience was not a massive deficit to him. He got up to speed quite quickly and was comfortably inside the top for the majority of the weekend before a string of bad luck which led to bad timing leaving him with 10th and 14th in the feature and sprint races respectively but he had better luck in Yas Marina, Abu Dhabi where he had a solid weekend that resulted in 9th and 8th in the feature and sprint races respectively to close off his rookie year in Formula 2.

2018

Formula E

2019-20 season 
In February 2020, Sette Câmara, along with former European Formula 3 teammate Joel Eriksson, joined the GEOX Dragon Formula E team as reserve driver and entrant into the March rookie test in Marrakesh. In the test, his efforts saw him set the second fastest time of the day behind Envision Virgin Racing entrant Nick Cassidy. In July 2020, following Brendon Hartley's departure from the outfit, Dragon promoted Sette Câmara to the second race seat for the season finale in Berlin.

2020-21 season 
In November, the team confirmed Sette Câmara would join the series full time as part of the 2020–21 line-up. He scored his first points finish in Formula E with a 4th place finish at the Diriyah ePrix. This was Dragon's best finish in Formula E since the 2019 Swiss ePrix. He finished 8th at the London ePrix to take his second points finish of the season.

2021-22 season 
Sette Câmara was signed by Dragon for the 2021–22 season. Ex-F1 driver Antonio Giovinazzi was signed as his teammate. He finished 9th in the London ePrix, scoring his team's and his only points of the season.

2022–23 season 
Sette Câmara switched to NIO 333 FE Team for the 2022–23 season.

Formula One
After impressive pace in Formula 3 in 2015, Red Bull signed him to the Red Bull Junior Team. In the beginning of 2017, Sette Câmara was dropped from the Red Bull Junior Team program. In November 2018 he was signed by McLaren as a 2019 test and development driver and took part in the 2019 Catalunya Young Driver Test, but returned to the Red Bull program in 2020.

Karting record

Karting career summary

Complete CIK-FIA Karting European Championship results 
(key) (Races in bold indicate pole position) (Races in italics indicate fastest lap)

Racing record

Racing career summary 

† As Sette Câmara was a guest driver, he was ineligible to score championship points.
* Season still in progress.

Complete FIA Formula 3 European Championship results
(key) (Races in bold indicate pole position, races in italics indicate fastest race lap)

† As Sette Câmara was a guest driver, he was ineligible to score championship points.

Complete Macau Grand Prix results

Complete FIA Formula 2 Championship results
(key) (Races in bold indicate pole position) (Races in italics indicate points for the fastest lap of top ten finishers)

Complete Formula E results
(key) (Races in bold indicate pole position; races in italics indicate fastest lap)

Complete Super Formula results
(key) (Races in bold indicate pole position) (Races in italics indicate fastest lap)

References

External links

1998 births
Living people
Brazilian Formula Three Championship drivers
FIA Formula 2 Championship drivers
FIA Formula 3 European Championship drivers
Karting World Championship drivers
Sportspeople from Belo Horizonte
Toyota Racing Series drivers
Brazilian Formula E drivers
EuroInternational drivers
Motopark Academy drivers
Carlin racing drivers
MP Motorsport drivers
DAMS drivers
Dragon Racing drivers
Brazilian racing drivers
Super Formula drivers
NIO 333 FE Team drivers
21st-century Brazilian people
B-Max Racing drivers